{{Speciesbox
| image = Stellarialongipes-altocaulis.jpg
| genus = Stellaria
| species = longipes
| authority = Goldie
| synonyms = 
 Alsine longipes (Goldie) Coville
 Stellularia longipes (Goldie) MacMill.
}}Stellaria longipes is a species of flowering plant in the family Caryophyllaceae known by the common names longstalk starwort and Goldie's starwort. It has a circumpolar distribution, occurring throughout the northernmost latitudes of the Northern Hemisphere. It is a perennial herb that grows in a wide variety of habitat types, including tundra and taiga and many areas farther south with subalpine and alpine climates. It is extremely variable in morphology, its form depending on both genetic makeup and environmental conditions. It has a widely varying number of chromosomes. In general, it is a rhizomatous perennial herb forming mats or clumps, or growing erect. The stems may be short and simple or with sprawling and highly branched. The linear to lance-shaped leaves are usually 1 to 4 centimeters long and are oppositely arranged in pairs. The inflorescence bears one or more flowers, each on a short pedicel. The flower has five pointed green sepals each a few millimeters long. There are five white petals each divided into two lobes, sometimes shallowly, but often so deeply there appear to be two petals. The plant is gynodioecious, with some flowers having functional male and female reproductive parts and others being only female.

There are two subtaxa. The rarer of the two, subsp. arenicola'', is limited to the sand dunes adjacent to Lake Athabasca in central Canada.

References

External links
Jepson Manual Treatment: var. longipes
Flora of North America
Photo gallery

longipes
Flora of Eastern Europe
Flora of Subarctic America
Flora of Canada
Flora of the Northeastern United States
Flora of the North-Central United States
Flora of the South-Central United States
Flora of the Northwestern United States
Flora of the Southwestern United States
Flora without expected TNC conservation status